Thomas Otway (1615 – 6 March 1692) was an Anglican bishop in Ireland.

Otway was born in Wiltshire. He was educated at Sedbergh School and later consecrated Bishop of Killala and Achonry on 29 January 1671. He was translated to Ossory on 7 February 1680. From 1680 until 1691 he was also Archdeacon of Armagh in commendam. He attended the short-lived Patriot Parliament summoned by James II of England in 1689. He died on 6 March 1692 in Kilkenny.

References 

1615 births
People from Wiltshire
Bishops of Killala and Achonry
Anglican bishops of Ossory
1692 deaths
Archdeacons of Armagh
Members of the Irish House of Lords